Renaud Jamoul (born 10 June 1984) is a Belgian rallying co-driver. He partnered with Adrien Fourmaux for M-Sport Ford World Rally Team in the World Rally Championship and World Rally Championship-2 categories in 2019-2021. Mid 2021, he was replaced by  Alexandre Coria

Rally career
Jamoul made his WRC debut at the 2006 Rally Catalunya. The current partnership with the French driver Adrien Fourmaux was started in 2019, with both of them are set to drive for M-Sport Ford World Rally Team in the sport's top tier.

Rally results

WRC results

* Season still in progress.

References

External links

 Renaud Jamoul's e-wrc profile

1984 births
Living people
Belgian rally co-drivers
World Rally Championship co-drivers